Marcelo da Conceição Benevenuto Malaquias (born 7 January 1996), simply known as Marcelo Benevenuto, is a Brazilian footballer who plays as a central defender for Fortaleza.

Club career
Born in Resende, Rio de Janeiro, Marcelo joined Botafogo in 2016, initially on loan from Resende. On 17 June 2016, he was bought outright and signed a contract until 2019.

Marcelo made his senior debut on 7 September 2016, coming on as a late substitute for Diego in a 1–0 home win against Fluminense for the Série A championship. Definitely promoted to the main squad ahead of the 2017 season, he became a regular starter during the club's Copa Libertadores run, and renewed his contract until 2020 on 13 February of that year.

Honours

Club
Botafogo
 Campeonato Carioca: 2018

Fortaleza
Campeonato Cearense: 2021, 2022
Copa do Nordeste: 2022

Individual
 Campeonato Carioca Team of the Year: 2020

References

External links

1996 births
Living people
Sportspeople from Rio de Janeiro (state)
Association football defenders
Brazilian footballers
Campeonato Brasileiro Série A players
Botafogo de Futebol e Regatas players
Fortaleza Esporte Clube players